This is a list of schools in Southend-on-Sea in the English county of Essex.

State-funded schools

Primary schools

Barons Court Primary School
Blenheim Primary School
Bournemouth Park Academy
Bournes Green Infant School 	
Bournes Green Junior School
Chalkwell Hall Infant School
Chalkwell Hall Junior School 	
Darlinghurst Academy	
Earls Hall Primary School
Eastwood Primary School	
Edwards Hall Primary School 	
Fairways Primary School 	
Friars Primary School
Greenways Primary School
Hamstel Infant School	
Hamstel Junior School 	
Heycroft Primary School 	
Hinguar Community Primary School 	
Leigh North Street Primary School	
Milton Hall Primary School
Our Lady of Lourdes RC Primary School 	
Porters Grange Primary School
Prince Avenue Academy 	
Richmond Avenue Primary School 	
Sacred Heart RC Primary School 
St George's RC Primary School 	
St Helen's RC Primary School 	
St Mary's Prittlewell CE Primary School 	
Temple Sutton Primary School	
Thorpedene Primary School
West Leigh Infant School
West Leigh Junior School 	
Westborough Academy

Non-selective secondary schools

Belfairs Academy
Cecil Jones Academy
Chase High School
The Eastwood Academy
St Bernard's High School
St Thomas More High School
Shoeburyness High School
Southchurch High School

Grammar schools

Southend High School for Boys
Southend High School for Girls
Westcliff High School for Boys
Westcliff High School for Girls

Special and alternative schools
Kingsdown School
Lancaster School
The St Christopher School
St Nicholas School
Southend YMCA Community School
Sutton House Academy
Victory Park Academy

Further education
South Essex College

Independent schools

Primary and preparatory schools
Alleyn Court Prep School
St Michael's CofE Preparatory School
Saint Pierre School

Senior and all-through schools
Thorpe Hall School

Special and alternative schools
Compass Community School Boleyn Park
Estuary High School

References

External links
Performance tables for schools in Southend-on-Sea

Schools in Southend-on-Sea
Southend
Lists of buildings and structures in Essex